Azizabat is a village in the District of Kuyucak, Aydın Province, Turkey. As of 2010, it had a population of 509 people.

A few km southeast of Azizabat lie the ruins of Antioch on the Maeander, an ancient Byzantine city, and location of the Battle of Antioch on the Meander in 1211 between the forces of the Empire of Nicea and the Seljuk Turks.

References

Villages in Kuyucak District